Plays Well with Others may refer to:

 Doesn't Play Well with Others album by Lagwagon and Joey Cape 2011
 Plays Well with Others (Greg Koch album) 2013
 Plays Well with Others (Phil Collins album) 2018 4 CD Boxset

[[Category:Disambiguation pages